is a Japanese voice actor. After working as a stage performer, Ishige wanted to do voice acting in anime, which he did with his first role as additional voices in Orange and later his first major role as Yusaku Fujiki in Yu-Gi-Oh! VRAINS. Some of his other noteworthy roles include Yun Arikawa in Godzilla Singular Point and Wakana Gojo in My Dress-Up Darling.

Biography
Ishige was born in Saitama Prefecture on August 20, 1990. In high school, Ishige was a fan of musicals; he later became a fan of Psycho-Pass. After graduating from high school, he joined the Shiki Theatre Company to pursue a career in acting. However, Ishige wanted to do voice acting in anime. In order to pursue this, he left the company and joined Stardust Promotion, where he was cast in his first role as additional voices in Orange and his first major role as Yusaku Fujiki in Yu-Gi-Oh! VRAINS.

In 2019, Ishige left Stardust Promotion and joined Intention.

Filmography

TV series
2016
 Orange as additional voices

2017
 Seiren as additional voices
 Yu-Gi-Oh! VRAINS as Yusaku Fujiki/Playmaker

2019
 Granblue Fantasy The Animation as Skull Knight

2020
 Moriarty the Patriot as Noahtic Audience

2021
 Don't Toy with Me, Miss Nagatoro as Gamer Boys
 So I'm a Spider, So What? as Ren Aikawa
 Godzilla Singular Point as Yun Arikawa
 Scarlet Nexus as Other Suppression Force

2022
 My Dress-Up Darling as Wakana Gojo
 Lucifer and the Biscuit Hammer as Ludo Shubarie

2023
 Ayakashi Triangle as Sōga Ninokuru
 The Fire Hunter as Koushi
 The Fruit of Evolution 2 as Theobold Terra Kaiser

Video games
2021
 Lost Judgment as Shion Takamori

Dubbing
All of Us Are Dead as Jung Min-jae (Jin Ho-eun)
West Side Story as Baby John (Patrick Higgins)
Willow as Prince Airk (Dempsey Bryk)

References

External links
 Official agency profile 
 

1990 births
Former Stardust Promotion artists
Japanese male video game actors
Japanese male voice actors
Living people
Male voice actors from Saitama Prefecture